A fish slice or metal spatula, in British English, is a kitchen tool with a wide, flat blade with long holes in it, used for lifting and turning food while cooking. In the US, it is regarded as a type of spatula and may be called a turner or flipper.
 
It was originally a serving implement for fish, usually made of silver, antique examples of which commonly appear at auction.  Fish slices were made of silver or Sheffield plate rather than steel to avoid the possibility of tainting the taste of the fish due to a reaction between the fish and its lemon seasoning and the steel. After 1745, their outlines were usually fish-shaped.

The term now refers to an implement used for turning fish and other foods when frying them, available in many materials such as stainless steel.  
The Victoria and Albert Museum has an extensive collection of metalwork fish slices from Britain and the US and includes both contemporary and historical pieces. Manufacturers include functional items, for example some from Josiah Wedgwood to more sculptural contemporary works by Ane Christensen.

References

Food preparation utensils